Ngolo Diarra was the king of the Bambara Empire from 1766 to 1795.

Following the 1755 death of empire founder Bitòn Coulibaly, his descendants (the Bitonsi) proved unable to maintain control, the kingdom fell briefly into chaos. Ngolo Diarra, a freed slave, seized the throne in 1766 and soon restored order. Mungo Park, passing through the Bambara capital of Ségou two years after Diarra's 1795 death, recorded a testament to the Empire's prosperity under his reign:

"The view of this extensive city, the numerous canoes on the river, the crowded population, and the cultivated state of the surrounding countryside, formed altogether a prospect of civilization and magnificence that I little expected to find in the bosom of Africa."1

Ngolo Diarra died in a campaign against the Mossi and was succeeded by his son Mansong Diarra. His descendants, the Ngolosi, continued to rule the Empire until its fall to Toucouleur conqueror El Hadj Umar Tall in 1861.

French football player N'Golo Kante is named after him.

References

Davidson, Basil. Africa in History. New York: Simon & Schuster, 1995.

External links
Timeline of Western Sudan
Pre-colonial Malian History {French language}

Notes 
 Qtd. in Davidson 245.

History of Mali
Bamana Empire
18th-century monarchs in Africa